A ruffian is a scoundrel, rascal or unprincipled, deceitful, and unreliable person.

Ruffian may refer to:
Ruffian (horse) (1972–1975), a famous thoroughbred racehorse
Ruffian (film), a 2007 television movie about the racehorse
Ruffian Games, a Scottish games developer
Ruffian, a chess engine
Ruffian 23, Irish sailboat designed by Billy Brown
Border Ruffians, pro-Slavery activists from Missouri in the American Civil War
The Ruffian on the Stair, a 1964 British play
HMS Bellerophon (1786), also known as Billy Ruffian
The Ruffians, the major antagonists of the Nintendo game Sin and Punishment
British codename of the German X-Geraet, radar system
The Ruffian, a 1983 French-Canadian criminal adventure film